Seesaw is the second novel by Timothy Ogene. It was published in London in November 2021 by Swift Press, and was reviewed in The Guardian, The Times, Unherd, Isele Magazine, and Writers Mosaic. Excerpts appeared in Granta and The Johannesburg Review of Books. It can be considered as a classic road novel and, at the same time, a satire; the voice of an unreliable narrator depicts American culture and politics as seen through the eyes of a Nigerian scholar visiting Boston.

Reference 

2021 Nigerian novels
Satirical novels
Novels set in Boston
Fiction with unreliable narrators